Jeong Moon-ho (born February 7, 1962) is a South Korea firefighter. He was born in Nonsan, Chungcheongnam-do and appointed as Fire Captain in 1990 finishing the 6th class of the Fire Cadet. He served as Fire Commissioner of National Fire Agency, Seoul Metropolitan Fire and Disaster Management Headquarters.

Education 
2001 Master in Safety Engineering, Hoseo University, Asan, Republic of Korea
1985 Bachelor in Chemistry, Chungnam National University, Daejeon, Republic of Korea

Career 
2018. 12. 15 ~	Commissioner of the National Fire Agency
2017 Commissioner of the Seoul Metropolitan Fire & Disaster Headquarters
2014 Commissioner of the Incheon Fire Headquarters
2014 Secondment to the Korea National Defense University
2012 Commissioner of the Chungnam Fire Headquarters
2009 Fire Policies Division, National Emergency Management Agency
2008 Fire Chief of the Gongju Fire Station, Chungnam Province
2004 Fire Chief of the Asan Fire Station, Chungnam Province

Awards 
2015 Order of Service Merit (Order of Okjogeunjeong)
2007 Presidential Citation

References

External links

Living people
1962 births
South Korean firefighters
People from Nonsan